Jhalak Man Gandarbha (झलकमान गन्धर्व) (29 July 1935 – 23 November 2003) was one of the most significant Nepali folk singers. He was known for popularising Gaine Geet or Gandarbha Sangeet, a popular type of folk song sang only by the Gaine or Gandarbha ethnic group of Nepal. He was the first Gaine singer to record Gaine song and is respected for bringing voice of indigenous and ordinary people into the mass media. Aamale Sodhlin Ni ... (mother may ask) is by far his most popular song, which intones the death of a Nepali soldier on a foreign battle ground.

Early life
Gandarbha started singing for a livelihood in villages of Nepal from the age of nine. Born to in 1935 to a family belonging to the Gandharbha clan, he learned to sing, dance, and play music early on from his father. The Gandharbhas play different kind of folk tunes like Jhyaure, Khyali, and Karkha (songs written to praise someone for their deeds). They also play for the gods. The Gandarbhas have a unique four string instrument called Sarangi. They play Sarangi and sing along around the village and thus entertain the society.

The former government had banned the Gandarbhas from singing Karkha, for they praised the heroes. Since then Karkha had almost been lost. But since Jhalak Man composed Karkhas of some twenty Nepali heroes who have shown their bravity during the Second World War. Gaje Ghale, honored with Victoria Cross after the Second World War, was one of them.

The Gandarbhas are inhabitants in Gorkha, Kaski, Lamjung, Dang, Salyan, Tanahu, Baglung, Parbat, Palpa, Banke, Bardiya, Chitwan, Makwanpur, and Syangja districts. Jhalak Man believed that this caste of people is primarily from Gorkha and was scattered throughout the country in their course for the search for new villages to entertain.

He had recorded a single album. But the demand for the album was so high that Music Nepal, who released his cassette, paid him a royalty of Rs.2000-3000 per month. He was very grateful to Keshari Dharmaraj Thapa, for offering him a place in Radio Nepal Station in 1965. 

In his course of performing his songs internationally he has toured different countries like German, Belgium, Yugoslavia, France, and India.

He appreciated the significant efforts made by Kumar Basnet, Ram Thapa, Sambhu Rai, Jayananda Lama, Prem Raja Mahat, Bam Bahadur Karki, Chandra Shah, Mira Rana, Gyanu Rana, Dharmaraj Thapa, and Lochan Bhattarai to preserve the importance of folk songs. He reminds the responsible sector to install a reliable research program to collect and promote folksongs of our country and warns them of the crucial stage in which these folksongs have reached in our fast modernizing country.

Career
Gandarbha composed Karkhas of some twenty Nepali heroes who have shown their bravery during the Second World War. He recorded only one album in his lifetime but that was enough to give him the recognition of one of the most influential and popular folk singers of Nepal. He devoted his entire life in collecting, composing, performing and promoting Gaine Geet.

He also performed in various countries, including Germany, Belgium, Yugoslavia, France, and India.

Filmography

References

1935 births
Performers of Hindu music
Nepalese folk singers
2003 deaths
People from Pokhara
20th-century Nepalese male singers
Dohori singers